Oxtail soup is a soup made with beef tails. The use of the word "ox" in this context is a legacy of nomenclature; no specialized stock of beef animals are used and tails may come from bovines other than oxen. It is believed by some that oxtail soup was invented in Spitalfields in London in the seventeenth century by French Huguenot and Flemish immigrants, from the tails of animals. Different versions of oxtail soup exist: Korean; Chinese; a fried/barbecued oxtail combined with soup variation which is a popular dish in Indonesia where it is called as sop buntut; an ethnic dish of the American South which traces its lineage back to the pre-revolutionary war era; and a thick, rich, gravy-like soup popular in the United Kingdom since the 18th century. Creole oxtail soup is made from a tomato base with oxtails, potatoes, green beans, corn, mirepoix, garlic, and herbs and spices.

Chinese oxtail soup 
Though translated literally as "oxtail soup" (牛尾汤 Niúwěi tāng), this version of the dish is somewhere between a soup and a stew. One of the defining characteristics of oxtail soup is that it contains a large mass of solid ingredients, rather than ingredients that have been diced or shredded as is the norm with Chinese soup. Chunks of oxtail, potato, carrots, cabbage, tomato, and mushrooms are mixed in water, and salted to taste. The mixture should be heated at a slow boil, to allow time for the ingredients to release their flavors. In particular, the tomatoes and potatoes should largely disintegrate into the water, giving the broth a reddish-orange coloration and thickening it. As to be expected, oils from the oxtail lend most of the flavor. The soup is served with all of the ingredients.

Indonesian oxtail soup 

In Indonesian cuisine, oxtail soup is a popular dish. It is made of slices of fried or barbecued oxtail, served with vegetables in a rich but clear beef broth. It contains boiled potatoes, carrots, tomatoes, leek, celery, fried shallots and dried black mushrooms. Indonesian sop buntut is seasoned with shallot, garlic and native spices such as black pepper, nutmeg, and clove. A relatively new variant is called sop buntut goreng (fried oxtail soup), where the oxtail is seasoned, fried and served dry; the soup is served in a separate bowl. The dish is commonly eaten with rice and accompanied by sambal, sweet soy sauce and lime juice. Some restaurants specialize in oxtail soup, among them being the Bogor Café in the Hotel Borobudur in Central Jakarta.

Korean oxtail soup 

Korean oxtail soup, called kkori-gomtang, is a type of gomguk (beef bone soup).  It is colloquially known as "bone soup".  The broth is made with raw oxtail, garlic, salt, black pepper, green onions and other typical Korean flavors.  The soup must be simmered at low heat for several hours to soften the meat and make the broth.  During this time, the layer of fat must be regularly skimmed from the surface of the pot and discarded.  The final result is a rich beef broth with a garlic taste and bits of soft meat.

Canned 

A canned condensed oxtail soup was formerly available from the Campbell Soup Company. Oxtail is a popular variety of Heinz soups in the United Kingdom.

See also

Oxtail stew
 List of Chinese soups
 List of Indonesian soups
 List of soups

References

Soups
Chinese soups
Indonesian soups
Korean beef dishes
Korean soups and stews